Endi Poskovic (born as Elvedin Pošković on January 29, 1969) is an American visual artist, printmaker and educator.

His graphic work merges visual representation with text, often shifting the reading of the imagery through continuous representation and re-contextualization. Poskovic's woodcut prints invoke influences as disparate as early cinema, classic Japanese woodblock prints, devotional pictures, and Eastern European Propaganda poster. The amalgam of diverse scenarios and visual narratives in Poskovic's work imply accounts from personal and social histories and reference themes of cultural and environmental shifts, migration and alienation that are at once magnificent and tragic.

Biography

Elvedin Pošković was born on January 29, 1969, in Sarajevo, Bosnia and Herzegovina, which was then the former Socialist Federal Republic of Yugoslavia, Poskovic graduated from Sarajevo High School of Applied Arts and Sarajevo Principal Music School Mladen Pozajiċin in 1986 before attending the University of Sarajevo Academy of Fine Arts from which he graduated in 1990 in the class of Professor Dževad Hozo.

Between 1985 and 1989, Poskovic performed traditional music of Southeastern Europe and the Balkans and toured folk music festivals throughout Yugoslavia, as well as Western Europe and Western Asia. In the summer of 1990, Poskovic left SFR Yugoslavia to study in Norway on a Norwegian Government scholarship where he enrolled in Norwegian language immersion program at Nordmøre Folkehøgskolein Surnadal and studied drawing and painting with Jon Arne Mogstad. From Norway, Poskovic moved to the United States in 1991 to study with Harvey Breverman and Adele Henderson at the University at Buffalo, State University of New York where he graduated in 1993 with a Master of Fine Arts degree in art practice. While in Buffalo, New York, and in the years following, Poskovic exhibited at several major Western New York venues including the Burchfield Penney Art Center (1994 to 1995), the Albright-Knox Art Gallery, Hallwalls Contemporary Arts Center, and the Castellani Art Museum.  Since 1991, Poskovic has lived in New York, Indiana, California, North Carolina, Illinois, Nebraska, and Michigan where he has taught at several universities and colleges.  In 2008, Poskovic moved to Ann Arbor where he now teaches at the University of Michigan as Professor of Art and Design in the Penny W. Stamps School of Art & Design and Faculty Associate in the Center for Russian, East European and Eurasian Studies (CREES). In 2015, Poskovic was awarded a Fulbright Program U.S. Senior Scholar Grant for 2015-2016 academic year to Jan Matejko Academy of Fine Arts in Kraków, Poland, to research the formative years of the Kraków International Triennial and the role it played in the democratization of art and education in Poland and beyond.

Since 2003, Poskovic has actively traveled to China and Japan to research wood-block printing, painting, and papermaking. He has studied at China Academy of Art, Central Academy of Fine Arts, and Tokyo University of the Arts and visited Beijing, Changsha, Hangzhou, Nagoya, Suzhou, and Tokyo.

Work

Working in a range of print media from relief printing, intaglio, lithography to hybrid techniques, Poskovic's early graphic works typically juxtapose a strong central image with seemingly unrelated text in a foreign or imaginary language evoking a multileveled meaning. Writing for the Omaha Reader, artist Mary Day states that "Gazing at one of these prints becomes an apprehension of the unseen and unknown. The unknown being what came before, and after, this particular moment captured in an amalgam of image, text, paper, and ink." In recent years, Poskovic has worked extensively in lithography printmaking in collaboration with Tamarind Institute master printer Jill Graham at Open Studio Toronto, as well as NSCAD University in Halifax, Nova Scotia, producing a series of stone lithographic prints and animation Crossing Series. Poskovic's Crossing Series assimilates memory and reality as a way to underscore a personal tale of discovery. Working through additive and subtractive stone lithography printing and short animations to depict topography specific to Southeastern Herzegovina and Dalmatia region, Poskovic indirectly examines the recent political and demographic shifts in the country of his birth. The achromatic lithographs, based on small aluminum models Poskovic makes, are filmed and drawn directly on limestone from the film stills. The classical drawing’s translation through lithography’s dense method pays homage to the history of the process invented in 1796 by German author and playwright Alois Senefelder. In these works, Poskovic invokes the works of Frederic Edwin Church, Caspar David Friedrich, Edvard Munch, and Winslow Homer. In the animations, simple, eloquent transitions from image to image, such as an iceberg gradually morphing into a cloud, or a stormy, rain-filled cloud evaporating into nothing, create a familiar, yet unsettling experience. This hybrid blend of drawing, print, and animation creates an amalgam of possibilities, in which the unfamiliar becomes almost tactile, while the familiar (rocks, clouds, water) provides a handhold on reality.

Public collections

Poskovic's works are in the permanent public collections of the Philadelphia Museum of Art, the Aberystwyth University Museum of Art, the University of Iowa Stanley Museum of Art, Harvard University Fogg Museum, Detroit Institute of Arts, Des Moines Art Center, U.S. State Department Art in Embassies Program, Grand Valley State University, Indianapolis Museum of Art, Burchfield Penney Art Center, Art Museum of Estonia, The University of California, Berkeley Graphic Arts Collection. the McClung Museum of Natural History and Culture, Castellani Art Museum, City of Seattle Office of Arts & Culture 
and many others.

Significant awards and honors

1990 - Norwegian Government – Memorial Foundation of May 8 Scholarship
1994 - The Art Matters Foundation Grant
1995 - New York State Council on the Arts-Western New York Residency Fellowship
1997 - Indiana Arts Commission-Connection Fellowship in Visual Arts
1998 - Camargo Foundation Fellowship in Cassis, France (1999)
1999 - MacDowell Colony Fellowship
1999 - grant, Pollock-Krasner Foundation
2002 - fellowship, Kala Art Institute
2008 - Durfee Foundation ARC Grant
2010 - John D. Rockefeller Foundation Fellowship at the Bellagio Study Center, Bellagio, Italy
2011-12 - John Simon Guggenheim Memorial Foundation Fellowship
2015-16 - Fulbright Program U.S. Senior Scholar Grant to Poland as Artist-in-Residence at Jan Matejko Academy of Fine Arts in Kraków

Poskovic has also received artist-in-residence fellowships from the Bemis Center for Contemporary Arts, McColl Center for Visual Art, Open Studio Toronto, VCCA, Frans Masereel Centrum in Belgium, Can Serrat International Art Center and Fundación Valparaíso, both in Spain, MI-LAB (Mokuhanga Innovation Lab) in Japan, amongst others.

Further reading
Endi Poskovic: Sarajevo’s Andy Warhol, Tea Ivanovic, Sarajevo Oslobodjenje
"In Crossing the Dreams to Unnamed Reality"essay in Celebrating Print Magazine
Essay Catalog of the exhibition Souffrance et L'Aventure Plains Art Museum, 7 December 2000 – 11 February 2001.
Jacqueline van Rhyn Catalog essay published on occasion of the exhibition, Endi Poslovic: Endiana and other tales, Philadelphia Print Center, 19 January – 3 March 2001.
Amy N. Worthen Catalog essay published on occasion of the exhibition Endi Poskovic: Large Color Woodcuts: Des Moines Art Center, 22 September 2006 – 4 February 2007. 
Andrew Stevens Catalog essay published on occasion of the exhibition Endi Poskovic: They Are All Indespensible: Bemis Center for Contemporary Arts, 2 March – 26 May 2007.
Eric Mathew Brochure essay published on occasion of the exhibition Endi Poskovic: Merry Folly and the Mt. Blanca at Open Studio, 28 May – 20 June 2009.
Irfan Hošiċ Catalog essay published on occasion of the exhibition Bosanskohercegovačka umjetnost nakon 11/9 Gradska Galerija Bihaċ, 2–23 July 2009.
Donna Westerman Catalog essay published in conjunction with the exhibition Impact-The big print and in collaboration with LAPS Newsprint Journal, Frank M. Doyle Arts Pavilion, 9 September – 23 October 2009.
Nontoxic Print Some Thoughts on Making Very Big Prints
Interview with Sarah Burford, Guggenheim Foundation The Everyday Reality of a Different World: Endi Poskovic Shares his Vision''

References

External links
Endi Poskovic at the University of Michigan
Studio blog

1969 births
Living people
American printmakers
American
Printmakers
Yugoslav emigrants to the United States
Modern printmakers
Artists from Sarajevo
University at Buffalo alumni
University of Michigan faculty
University of Sarajevo alumni